William Peyton Cobb (1880-1963) served as the 30th Secretary of State of Alabama from 1919 to 1923.

Cobb was born on January 1, 1880. In 1900, he graduated from Troy Normal College, now known as Troy University and graduated from Law School at the University of Alabama in 1905.

He died on July 23, 1963.

References

1880 births
1963 deaths
Alabama Democrats